Bembidiini is a tribe of ground beetles in the family Carabidae. There are more than 120 genera and 3,100 described species in Bembidiini.

Genera

 Subtribe Anillina Jeannel, 1937
 Afranillus Giachino, 2015
 Afrodipnus Giachino, 2015
 Angustanillus Baehr & Main, 2016
 Anillaspis Casey, 1918
 Anillinus Casey, 1918
 Anillodes Jeannel, 1963
 Anillopsidius Coiffait, 1969
 Anillopsis Jeannel, 1937
 Anillotarsus Mateu, 1980
 Anillus Jacquelin du Val, 1851
 Argiloborus Jeannel, 1937
 Austranillus Giachino, 2005
 Bafutyphlus Bruneau de Miré, 1986
 Bhutanillus M.E.Schmid, 1975
 Bulirschia Giachino, 2008
 Bylibaraphanus Giachino; Eberhard & Perina, 2021
 Caeconannus Jeannel, 1963
 Caecoparvus Jeannel, 1937
 Carayonites Bruneau de Miré, 1986
 Cryptocharidius M.Etonti & Mateu, 1992
 Cryptorites Jeannel, 1950
 Dicropterus Ehlers, 1883
 Elgonotyphlus Sciaky & Zaballos, 1993
 Erwinanillus Giachino; Eberhard & Perina, 2021
 Externanillus Baehr & Main, 2016
 Geocharidius Jeannel, 1963
 Geocharis Ehlers, 1883
 Gilesdytes Giachino; Eberhard & Perina, 2021
 Gracilanillus Baehr & Main, 2016
 Gregorydytes Giachino; Eberhard & Perina, 2021
 Hesperanillus Baehr & Main, 2016
 Honduranillus Zaballos, 1997
 Hygranillus B.Moore, 1980
 Hypodipnites Jeannel, 1963
 Hypotyphlus Jeannel, 1937
 Iason Giachino & Vailati, 2011
 Iberanillus Español, 1971
 Illaphanus W.J.MacLeay, 1865
 Kimberleytyphlus Giachino; Eberhard & Perina, 2021
 Leleupanillus Basilewsky, 1976
 Magnanillus Baehr, 2017
 Malagasydipnus Giachino, 2008
 Malagasytyphlus Giachino, 2008
 Megastylulus Giachino & Sciaky, 2003
 Mexanillus Vigna Taglianti, 1973
 Microdipnites Jeannel, 1957
 Microdipnodes Basilewsky, 1960
 Microdipnus Jeannel, 1937
 Microtyphlus Linder, 1863
 Mystroceridius Reichardt, 1972
 Neodipnus Jeannel, 1957
 Neoillaphanus Giachino; Eberhard & Perina, 2021
 Nesamblyops Jeannel, 1937
 Nothanillus Jeannel, 1962
 Orthotyphlus Mateu & Zaballos, 1998
 Paranillopsis Cicchino & Roig-Juñent, 2001
 Paranillus Jeannel, 1949
 Parillaphanus Baehr, 2018
 Parvocaecus Coiffait, 1956
 Pelocharis Jeannel, 1960
 Pelodiaetodes B.Moore, 1980
 Pelodiaetus Jeannel, 1937
 Pelonomites Jeannel, 1963
 Perucharidius Mateu & M.Etonti, 2002
 Pilbaradytes Giachino; Eberhard & Perina, 2021
 Pilbaranillus Baehr & Main, 2016
 Pilbaraphanus Giachino; Eberhard & Perina, 2021
 Prioniomus Jeannel, 1937
 Pseudanillus Bedel, 1896
 Pseudillaphanus Giachino, 2005
 Rhegmatobius Jeannel, 1937
 Scotodipnus Schaum, 1860
 Selenodipnus Jeannel, 1963
 Serranillus Barr, 1995
 Serratotyphlus Giachino, 2008
 Stylulus L.Schaufuss, 1882
 Tasmanillus Giachino, 2005
 Typhlocharis Dieck, 1869
 Typhlonesiotes Jeannel, 1937
 Winklerites Jeannel, 1937
 Zapotecanillus Sokolov, 2013
 Zeanillus Jeannel, 1937
 Zoianillus Sciaky, 1994
 Subtribe Bembidiina Stephens, 1827
 Amerizus Chaudoir, 1868
 Asaphidion Gozis, 1886
 Bembidion Latreille, 1802
 Caecidium Ueno, 1971
 Lionepha Casey, 1918
 Ocys Stephens, 1828
 Orzolina Machado, 1987
 Sinechostictus Motschulsky, 1864
 Subtribe Horologionina Jeannel, 1949
 Horologion Valentine, 1932
 Subtribe Lovriciina Giachino; B.Gueorguiev & Vailati, 2011
 Lovricia Pretner, 1979
 Neolovricia Lakota; Jalzic & J.Moravec, 2009
 Paralovricia Giachino; B.Gueorguiev & Vailati, 2011
 Subtribe Tachyina Motschulsky, 1862
 Aenigmatachys Baehr, 2020
 Afrotachys Basilewsky, 1958
 Anomotachys Jeannel, 1946
 Costitachys Erwin, 1974
 Elaphropus Motschulsky, 1839
 Kiwitachys Larochelle & Larivière, 2007
 Liotachys Bates, 1871
 Lymnastis Motschulsky, 1862
 Meotachys Erwin, 1974
 Micratopus Casey, 1914
 Moirainpa Erwin, 1984
 Nothoderis Boyd & Erwin, 2016
 Pericompsus LeConte, 1852
 Polyderidius Jeannel, 1962
 Porotachys Netolitzky, 1914
 Setitachys Baehr, 2016
 Stigmatachys Boyd & Erwin, 2016
 Straneoites Basilewsky, 1947
 Tachys Dejean, 1821
 Tachysbembix Erwin, 2004
 Tachyta Kirby, 1837
 Tachyxysta Boyd & Erwin, 2016
 Subtribe Xystosomina Erwin, 1994
 Erwiniana Paulsen & A.Smith, 2003
 Geballusa Erwin, 1994
 Gouleta Erwin, 1994
 Inpa Erwin, 1978
 Mioptachys Bates, 1882
 Philipis Erwin, 1994
 Xystosomus Schaum, 1863

References

Trechinae